Aleksei Gennadyevich Guskov   (born 20 May 1958) is a Soviet and Russian actor and producer. He was awarded  People's Artist of Russia in 2007.

Early life
Aleksei Guskov was born to Russian parents on 20 May 1958 in Brzeg, Poland, where his father - a military pilot - was stationed. Soon the family moved to Kiev in the Soviet Union. After high school in Moscow, he entered the Moscow Higher Technical School named after Bauman. He studied at this school for nearly five years, but in 1979 dropped out and entered the Moscow Art Theatre School, from which he graduated in 1983 (course of Viktor Monyukov).

He started his acting career at the Moscow Drama Theater. A.Pushkin, where he worked from 1984 to 1986. In 1986-1988 - actor theater on Malaya Bronnaya, in 1988-1991 - Theater "Detective", then - Actor Theater. Nikolai Gogol. Currently Aleksei work at the State Academic Theater E. Vakhtangov. For four years he taught acting at the Moscow Art Theater School. He played more than 50 roles in movies.

Since 1994 he is president of the animation studio "F.A.F. Entertainment".

In 2000 he starred in one of his most famous and prominent roles - The border guard-smuggler Nikita Goloschekin in the series A. Mitta "The Border. Taiga Romance". He also served as one of the producers of the picture.

Personal life
Was married to Tatyana (divorced), daughter Natalya Guskova.

Wife Lydia Velezheva, Russian actress of the "State Academic Theatre named after E. Vakhtangov", two sons Vladimir Guskov and Dmitry Guskov.

Selected filmography

External links
Official website
 

People from Brzeg
1958 births
Living people
Soviet male film actors
Soviet male stage actors
Russian film producers
Russian male film actors
Russian male television actors
Russian male stage actors
20th-century Russian male actors
21st-century Russian male actors
People's Artists of Russia
Honored Artists of the Russian Federation
State Prize of the Russian Federation laureates
United Russia politicians
21st-century Russian politicians
Moscow Art Theatre School alumni